Maratus proszynskii is a species of the genus Maratus (peacock spiders), first found in Tasmania.

References

Further reading
Maddison, Wayne P. "A phylogenetic classification of jumping spiders (Araneae: Salticidae)." Journal of Arachnology 43.3 (2015): 231-292.

Salticidae
Spiders of Australia
Spiders described in 2015